The Nabataeans or Nabateans (Nabataean Aramaic: , , vocalized as ; Arabic: , , singular , ; compare) were an ancient Arab people who inhabited northern Arabia and the southern Levant. Their settlements—most prominently the assumed capital city of Raqmu (present-day Petra, Jordan)—gave the name Nabatene to the Arabian borderland that stretched from the Euphrates to the Red Sea.

The Nabateans emerged as a distinct civilization and political entity between the 4th and 2nd centuries BCE, with their kingdom centered around a loosely controlled trading network that brought considerable wealth and influence across the ancient world.

Described as fiercely independent by contemporary Greco-Roman accounts, the Nabataeans were annexed into the Roman Empire by Emperor Trajan in 106 CE. Nabataeans' individual culture, easily identified by their characteristic finely potted painted ceramics, was adopted into the larger Greco-Roman culture. They later converted to Christianity during the Later Roman Era.

Name

Identity
The Nabataeans were an Arab tribe who had come under significant Babylonian-Aramaean influence.

History

Neo-Assyrian period

During the 8th to 7th centuries BCE, the Nabataeans were living in the part of the Syrian Desert immediately adjacent to the western border of Babylonia, and at the time of the Babylonian king Marduk-apla-iddina II, some of them were present in Babylonia itself, with his inscriptions recording the existence of a city of Nabatu settled by this tribe. Some of these Babylonian Nabataeans were placed by the Neo-Assyrian king Šarru-kīn II into the service of the governor of Ašipā.

The Nabataeans were mentioned again by the Neo-Assyrian king Sîn-ahhī-erība, although his inscriptions do not contain any further information about them.

During the 660s and 650s BCE, the Nabataeans were ruled by a chief bearing the Babylonian Aramaic name of Nadnu, reflecting the significant Babylonian cultural influence under which the tribe was. During this period, the Nabataeans were vassals of the Neo-Assyrian king Aššur-bāni-apli, and their neighbours in the Babylonian border region were the Arab tribe of Masʾaya, who themselves lived in the western border regions of Bīt-Amukkani.

At one point during the early years of Aššur-bāni-apli's reign, Yauṯaʿ ben Ḥazaʾil, the king of another the Arab tribe of the Qedarites, had rebelled against the Neo-Assyrian Empire, prompting Aššur-bāni-apli to conduct a campaign against the Qedarites. After Aššur-bāni-apli had defeated the Qedarite king Yauṯaʿ ben Ḥazaʾil, the latter fled into the territory of the Nabataeans, who were then living beyond the area of control and influence of the Neo-Assyrian Empire, and sought the sanctuary of Nadnu. Due to increased Assyrian influence in the desert as a result of his campaign, however, Nadnu refused to grant refuge to Yauṯaʿ, and he himself instead swore allegiance Aššur-bāni-apli and pledged to pay annual tribute to the Neo-Assyrian Empire.

In 652 BCE, the Babylonian king Šamaš-šuma-ukin rebelled against his younger brother, the Neo-Assyrian king Aššur-bāni-apli. Shortly after, in 651 BCE, Nadnu also rebelled against Aššur-bāni-apli and made contact with Šamaš-šuma-ukin, who offered captives from Sippar to his envoys at Kutha. Although the Qedarites had supported Šamaš-šuma-ukin in the war which opposed Šamaš-šuma-ukin to Aššur-bāni-apli as result of this rebellion, there is no information available regarding the role of Nadnu's involvement within this conflict.

According to letters sent to Aššur-bāni-apli by the Assyrian general Nabȗ-šum-lišir who served in the region of the south-west border of Babylonia at the time of Shamash-shum-ukin's rebellion, a caravan which had left the territory of the Nabataeans was attacked by one Ayakabaru son of ʿAmyaṯaʿ of the Masʾaya tribe, with only one of its members managing to escape and reaching a fortified Assyrian outpost.

Following the complete suppression of the Babylonian revolt in 648 BCE, while the Assyrians were busy until 646 BCE conducting operations against the Elamite kings who had supported Shamash-shum-ukin, the southern Phoenician cities and the kingdom of Judah seized the opportunity and rebelled against Assyrian authority. By this time, most of the Nabataeans had moved into the steppe regions of the Syrian Desert, more specifically in the north-east of the Palmyrena region, where Nadnu's Nabataeans, along with the Qedarites led by their chiefs Abyaṯiʿ, Ayammu, and Yuhayṯiʿ ben Birdāda, took advantage of the situation to conduct raids against the western borderlands of the Neo-Assyrian Empire ranging from the Jabal al-Bišrī to the environs of the city of Damascus, and were able to intensify their pressure on the areas of the Middle Euphrates and of Palmyrena.

Once the Assyrian war in Elam was complete, in 645 BCE Aššur-bāni-apli attacked the Qedarites and the Nabataeans during a three-months campaign with the goal of subjugating the Arabs permanently. The Assyrian armies first attacked from Ḫadattâ, passing through the desert between Laribda, Ḫuraruna and Yarki before reaching Azalla after defeating the joint forces of the Qedarites, Nabataeans, and another tribe, the Isammeʾ, in the region between Yarki and Azalla; the Assyrians then proceeded from Azalla to Quraṣiti, where they attacked Yuhayṯiʿ ben Birdāda, who fled, captured his mother, sister and family, many prisoners, as well as donkeys, camels, sheep, and goats, and seized the tribe's idols, and dispatched them all through the Damascus road; finally, the Assyrians marched out from Damascus till Ḫulḫuliti, and from there carried out their final attack on the Arabs near the Mount Ḫukkurina, where they captured Abyaṯiʿ and Ayammu. Due to the Assyrian campaign, the Qedarites rebelled against Yuhayṯiʿ and handed him over to the Assyrians.
Some time after the campaign against the Qedarites was complete, during the later 640s BCE the Assyrians conducted a campaign against the Nabataeans, who were then living around the Wādī Sirḥān or to its immediate south. During this campaign, the Assyrian army destroyed the settlements of the Nabataeans and captured Nadnu, his wife, his children, and large amounts of booty. Nadnu's son, Nuḫuru, was able to escape before willingly surrendering to Aššur-bāni-apli, who appointed him as the new king of the Nabataeans.

Neo-Babylonian period
The Nabataeans appear to not have pressed against the Transjordanian region during the period which oversaw the collapse of the Neo-Assyrian Empire and its replacement by the Neo-Babylonian Empire, and the Canaanite kingdoms of Palestine were strong enough to resist the Arabs once the region had come under Babylonian hegemony.

In the 6th century BCE, the Nabataeans were living in the northwestern part of the Arabian peninsula to the south of the Wādī Sirḥān, possibly in the region of Taymāʾ and al-Jawf, where they neighboured the Canaanite state of Edom, and where, according to a 6th century BCE inscription from the Jabal Ġunaym, they had engaged in war against the people of the oasis of Taymāʾ.

After the Neo-Babylonian king Nabû-kudurri-uṣur II annexed the Canaanite kingdoms of Judah in 587 BC and of Ammon and Moab in 582 BC, and the later Neo-Babylonian king Nabonidus campaigned through Edom in 553 BC, the resulting power vacuum in Transjordan allowed the Arabs of the Syrian desert, including the Qedarites and the Nabataeans, to expand into these former states' settled territories close to the desert, including across southern Transjordan and Palestine until the Judaean hills, where they remained throughout the existence of the Neo-Babylonian Empire and cohabited with the sedentary Ammonite, Moabite, and Edomite populations, with whom these Arab incomers mingled over several generations.

Achaemenid period
When Kūruš II conquered the Neo-Babylonian Empire in 539 BC, the Arab populations of the Syrian desert and of North Arabia, including the Qedarites, as well as the desert routes going into Mesopotamia from these regions, became part of his Persian Achaemenid Empire. Thanks to the Achaemenid Empire's multinational structure and its policy of tolerance and the end of any independent polities within Transjordan and Palestine, these Arab groups became integrated into the Persian Empire's economic, administrative, and military systems, with this process also being driven by the development of trade in Arabia as well as the military activities of the Achaemenid kings due to which warriors from all the populations ruled by their empire, including those from the Arab peoples, required their enrollment into the Achaemenid army.

Thus, in 480 BC, camel-riding Arab units participated in the Achaemenid king Xšayār̥šā I's invasion of Greece, and Arab units of the Achaemenid army also participated in the empire's overseas and coastal military activities in 410 and 386 BC.

Achaemenid rule over the Transjordanian Arabs lasted until Egypt under Amyrtaeus rebelled against Persian rule and embarked on anti-Persian activities in Palestine, Phoenicia and Cyprus at the same time that the Persian Empire was itself facing a number of internal crisis which greatly weakened it. In this situation, Persian rule broke down in Transjordan, which became independent.

Hellenistic period

The Nabataeans remained independent after the Macedonian conquest of the Achaemenid Empire by Alexander III of Macedon and during the time of the Hellenistic states established by the Diadochi.

The first mention of the Nabataeans during the Hellenistic period dates from 312/311 BCE, when they were attacked at Sela or perhaps at Petra without success by Antigonus I's officer Athenaeus in the course of the Third War of the Diadochi; at that time Hieronymus of Cardia, a Seleucid officer, mentioned the Nabataeans in a battle report. About 50 BCE, the Greek historian Diodorus Siculus cited Hieronymus in his report, and added the following: "Just as the Seleucids had tried to subdue them, so the Romans made several attempts to get their hands on that lucrative trade." They wrote a letter to Antigonus in Syriac letters, and Aramaic continued as the language of their coins and inscriptions when the tribe grew into a kingdom and profited by the decay of the Seleucids to extend its borders northward over the more fertile country east of the Jordan river. They occupied Hauran, and in about 85 BCE their king Aretas III became lord of Damascus and Coele-Syria.

Nabataean Kingdom

Petra was rapidly built in the 1st century BC, and developed a population estimated at 20,000.

The Nabataeans were allies of the first Hasmoneans in their struggles against the Seleucid monarchs. They then became rivals of the Judaean dynasty, and a chief element in the disorders that invited Pompey's intervention in Judea. According to popular historian Paul Johnson, many Nabataeans were forcefully converted to Judaism by Hasmonean king Alexander Jannaeus. It was this king who, after putting down a local rebellion, invaded and occupied the Nabataean towns of Moab and Gilead and imposed a tribute of an unknown amount. Obodas I knew that Alexander would attack, so was able to ambush Alexander's forces near Gaulane destroying the Judean army (90 BC).

The Roman military was not very successful in their campaigns against the Nabataeans. In 62 BCE, Marcus Aemilius Scaurus accepted a bribe of 300 talents to lift the siege of Petra, partly because of the difficult terrain and the fact that he had run out of supplies. Hyrcanus II, who was a friend of Aretas, was despatched by Scaurus to the King to buy peace. In so obtaining peace, King Aretas retained all his possessions, including Damascus, and became a Roman vassal.

In 32 BCE, during King Malichus II's reign, Herod the Great, with the support of Cleopatra, started a war against Nabataea. The war began with Herod plundering Nabataea with a large cavalry force, and occupying Dium. After this defeat, the Nabataean forces amassed near Canatha in Syria, but were attacked and routed. Cleopatra's general, Athenion, sent Canathans to the aid of the Nabataeans, and this force crushed Herod's army, which then fled to Ormiza. One year later, Herod's army overran Nabataea.

After an earthquake in Judaea, the Nabateans rebelled and invaded Judea, but Herod at once crossed the Jordan river to Philadelphia (modern Amman) and both sides set up camp. The Nabataeans under Elthemus refused to give battle, so Herod forced the issue when he attacked their camp. A confused mass of Nabataeans gave battle but were defeated. Once they had retreated to their defences, Herod laid siege to the camp and over time some of the defenders surrendered. The remaining Nabataean forces offered 500 talents for peace, but this was rejected. Lacking water, the Nabataeans were forced out of their camp for battle, but were defeated in this last battle.

Roman period
An ally of the Roman Empire, the Nabataean kingdom flourished throughout the 1st century. Its power extended far into Arabia along the Red Sea to Yemen, and Petra was a cosmopolitan marketplace, though its commerce was diminished by the rise of the Eastern trade-route from Myos Hormos to Coptos on the Nile. Under the Pax Romana, the Nabataeans lost their warlike and nomadic habits and became a sober, acquisitive, orderly people, wholly intent on trade and agriculture. The kingdom was a bulwark between Rome and the wild hordes of the desert except in the time of Trajan, who reduced Petra and converted the Nabataean client state into the Roman province of Arabia Petraea. By the 3rd century, the Nabataeans had stopped writing in Aramaic and begun writing in Greek instead, and by the 5th century they had converted to Christianity. The new Arab invaders, who soon pressed forward into their seats, found the remnants of the Nabataeans transformed into peasants. Their lands were divided between the new Qahtanite Arab tribal kingdoms of the Byzantine vassals, the Ghassanid Arabs, and the Himyarite vassals, the Kingdom of Kinda in North Arabia. The city of Petra was brought to the attention of Westerners by the Swiss explorer Johann Ludwig Burckhardt in 1812.

Legacy

Biblical

The Nabateans appear in the Hebrew Bible as a tribe descended from Nəḇāyōṯ, the first son of Yīšmāʿēʾl, himself the son of ʾAḇrāhām and Hāgār, In the Bible, Yīšmāʿēʾl's eldest son Nəḇāyōṯ is given prominence due to the rule of primogeniture, with Yīšmāʿēʾl's second son Qēḏār also being given some level of prominence due to being the second-born son, making him the closest of Yīšmāʿēʾl's sons to the one standing for primogeniture.

Islamic
The tradition of claiming descent from Ibrāhīm's son ʾIsmāʿīl, called "genealogical Ishmaelism," was already present among some pre-Islamic Arabs, and, in Islamic sources, ʾIsmāʿīl is the eponymous ancestor of some of the Arab peoples of north-west Arabia, with prominence being accorded to his two eldest sons, Nābit or Nabīt (Biblical Nəḇāyōṯ) and Qaydar or Qaydār ((Biblical Qēḏār), who lived in eastern Transjordan, Sinai and the Ḥijāz, and whose descendant tribes were the most prominent ones among the twelve tribes of the Ishmaelites.

According to Islamic tradition, the Islamic prophet Muhammad is believed to have been a descendant of ʾIsmāʿīl through either Nābit or Qaydār depending on the scholar.

According to the scholar Irfan Shahîd, genealogical Ishmaelism was academically viewed with suspicion due to confusion in the Islamic period which led to ʾIsmāʿīl being considered as the ancestor of all Arabian tribes. According to Shahîd, genealogical Ishamelism in its original variant is instead more limited and applicable to only some Arab tribes.

Culture

Many examples of graffiti and inscriptions—largely of names and greetings—document the area of Nabataean culture, which extended as far north as the north end of the Dead Sea, and testify to widespread literacy; but except for a few letters no Nabataean literature has survived, nor was any noted in antiquity. Onomastic analysis has suggested that Nabataean culture may have had multiple influences. Classical references to the Nabataeans begin with Diodorus Siculus; they suggest that the Nabataeans' trade routes and the origins of their goods were regarded as trade secrets, and disguised in tales that should have strained outsiders' credulity. Diodorus Siculus (book II) described them as a strong tribe of some 10,000 warriors, preeminent among the nomads of Arabia, eschewing agriculture, fixed houses, and the use of wine, but adding to pastoral pursuits a profitable trade with the seaports in frankincense, myrrh and spices from Arabia Felix (today's Yemen), as well as a trade with Egypt in bitumen from the Dead Sea. Their arid country was their best safeguard, for the bottle-shaped cisterns for rain-water which they excavated in the rocky or clay-rich soil were carefully concealed from invaders.

Ibn Sayyar al-Warraq's Kitab al-Tabikh, the earliest known Arabic cookbook, contains a recipe for fermented Nabatean water bread. The yeast-leavened bread is made with a high quality wheat flour called samidh that is finely milled and free of bran and is baked in a tandoor.

Language
Historians such as Irfan Shahîd, Warwick Ball, Robert G. Hoyland, Michael C. A. Macdonald, and others believe Nabataeans spoke Arabic as their native language. John F. Healy states that "Nabataeans normally spoke a form of Arabic, while, like the Persians etc., they used Aramaic for formal purposes and especially for inscriptions." Proper names on their inscriptions suggest that they were ethnically Arabs who had come under Aramaic influence, and the Nabataeans had already some trace of Aramaic culture when they first appear in history. Some of the authors of Safaitic inscriptions identified themselves as Nabataeans.

Religion

The extent of Nabataean trade resulted in cross-cultural influences that reached as far as the Red Sea coast of southern Arabia. The gods worshiped at Petra were notably Dushara and Al-‘Uzzá. Dushara was the supreme deity of the Nabataean Arabs, and was the official god of the Nabataean Kingdom who enjoyed special royal patronage. His official position is reflected in multiple inscriptions that render him as "The god of our lord" (The King). The name Dushara is from the Arabic "Dhu ash-Shara": which simply means "the one of Shara", a mountain range south-east of Petra also known as Mount Seir. Therefore, from a Nabataean perspective, Dhushara was probably associated with the heavens. However, one theory which connects Dushara with the forest gives a different idea of the god. The eagle was one of the symbols of Dushara. It was widely used in Hegra as a source of protection for the tombs against thievery.

Nabataean inscriptions from Hegra suggest that Dushara was linked either with the sun, or with Mercury, with which Ruda, another Arabian god, was identified. "His throne" was frequently mentioned in inscriptions, certain interpretations of the text consider it as a reference for Dhushara's wife, goddess Harisha. She was probably a solar deity.

However, when the Romans annexed the Nabataean Kingdom, Dushara still had an important role despite losing his former royal privilege. The greatest testimony to the status of the god after the fall of the Nabataean Kingdom was during the 1000th anniversary of the founding of Rome where Dushara was celebrated in Bostra by striking coins in his name, Actia Dusaria (linking the god with Augustus victory at Actium). He was venerated in his Arabian name with a Greek fashion in the reign of an Arabian emperor, Philip.

Sacrifices of animals were common and Porphyry’s De Abstenentia reports that, in Dumat Al-Jandal, a boy was sacrificed annually and was buried underneath an altar. Some scholars have extrapolated this practice to the rest of the Nabataeans.

The Nabataeans used to represent their gods as featureless pillars or blocks. Their most common monuments to the gods, commonly known as "god blocks", involved cutting away the whole top of a hill or cliff face so as to leave only a block behind. However, over time the Nabataeans were influenced by Greece and Rome and their Gods became anthropomorphic and were represented with human features.

Language

The Nabataeans spoke an Arabic dialect but, for their inscriptions, used a form of Aramaic that was heavily influenced by Arabic forms and words. When communicating with other Middle Eastern peoples, they, like their neighbors, used Aramaic, the region's lingua franca. Therefore, Aramaic was used for commercial and official purposes across the Nabataean political sphere. The Nabataean alphabet itself also developed out of the Aramaic alphabet, but it used a distinctive cursive script from which the Arabic alphabet emerged. There are different opinions concerning the development of the Arabic script. J. Starcky considers the Lakhmids' Syriac form script as a probable candidate. However, John F. Healey states that: "The Nabataean origin of the Arabic script is now almost universally accepted".

In surviving Nabataean documents, Aramaic legal terms are followed by their equivalents in Arabic. That could suggest that the Nabataeans used Arabic in their legal proceedings but recorded them in Aramaic.

The name may be derived from the same root as Akkadian nabatu, to shine brightly.

Agriculture

Although not as dry as at present, the area occupied by the Nabataeans was still a desert and required special techniques for agriculture. One was to contour an area of land into a shallow funnel and to plant a single fruit tree in the middle. Before the 'rainy season', which could easily consist of only one or two rain events, the area around the tree was broken up. When the rain came, all the water that collected in the funnel would flow down toward the fruit tree and sink into the ground. The ground, which was largely loess, would seal up when it got wet and retain the water.

In the mid-1950s, a research team headed by Michael Evenari set up a research station near Avdat (Evenari, Shenan and Tadmor 1971). He focused on the relevance of runoff rainwater management in explaining the mechanism of the ancient agricultural features, such as terraced wadis, channels for collecting runoff rainwater, and the enigmatic phenomenon of "Tuleilat el-Anab". Evenari showed that the runoff rainwater collection systems concentrate water from an area that is five times larger than the area in which the water actually drains.

Another study was conducted by Y. Kedar in 1957, which also focused on the mechanism of the agriculture systems, but he studied soil management, and claimed that the ancient agriculture systems were intended to increase the accumulation of loess in wadis and create an infrastructure for agricultural activity. This theory has also been explored by E. Mazor, of the Weizmann Institute of Science.

Architects and stonemasons

 Apollodorus of Damascus - Nabataean architect and engineer from Damascus, Roman Syria, who flourished during the 2nd century AD. his massive architectural output gained him immense popularity during his time. He is one of the few architects whose name survives from antiquity, and is credited with introducing several Eastern innovations to the Roman Imperial style, such as making the dome a standard.
 Wahb'allahi - a first century stonemason who worked in the city of Hegra. Wahb'allahi was the brother of the stonemason 'Abdharetat and the father of 'Abd'obodat. He is named in an inscription as the responsible stonemason on the oldest datable grave in Hegra in the ninth year of the Nabataean king Aretas IV (1 BCE-CE).
 'Abd'obodat son of Wahballahi - a 1st-century Nabatean Stonemason who worked in the city of Hegra. He is named by inscriptions on five of the grave facades typical of Hegra as the executing craftsman. On the basis of the inscriptions, four of the facades can be dated to the reigns of kings Aretas IV and Malichus II. 'Abd'obodat was evidently a successful craftsman. He succeeded his father Wahb'allahi and his uncle 'Abdharetat in at least one workshop in the second generation of Nabatean architects. 'Abd'obodat is considered to be the main representative of one of the two main schools of the Nabataean stonemasons, to which his father, his uncle belonged. Two more grave facades are assigned to the school on the basis of stylistic investigations; 'Abd'obodat is probably to be regarded as the stonemason who carried out the work.
 'Aftah - a Nabatean stonemason who became prominent in the beginning of the third decade of the first century. 'Aftah is attested in inscriptions on eight of the grave facades in Hegra and one grave as the executing stonemason. The facades are dated to the late reign of King Aretas IV . On one of the facades he worked with Halaf'allahi, on another with Wahbu and Huru . A tenth facade without an inscription was attributed to the 'Aftah sculpture school due to technical and stylistic similarities. He is the main representative of one of the two stonemason schools in the city of Hegra.
 Halaf'allahi - Nabatean stonemason who worked in the city of Hegra in the first century. Halaf'allahi is named in inscriptions on two graves in Hegra as the responsible stonemason in the reign of the Nabataean king Aretas IV. The first grave, which can be dated to the year 26-27 CE, was created together with the stonemason 'Aftah. He is therefore assigned to the workshop of the 'Aftah. Nabataean architects and sculptors were in reality contractors, who negotiated the costs of specific tomb types and their decorations. Tombs were therefore executed based on the desires and financial abilities of their future owners. The activities of Halaf'allahi offer an excellent example of this, as he had been commissioned with the execution of a simple tomb for a person who apparently belonged to the lower middle class. However, he was also in charge of completing a more sophisticated tomb for one of the local military officials.

Archeological sites
 Petra and Little Petra in Jordan
 Bosra in Syria
 Mada'in Saleh in northwest Saudi Arabia.
 Jabal al-Lawz in northwest Saudi Arabia.
 Shivta in the Negev Desert of Israel; disputed as a Nabataean precursor to a Byzantine colony.
 Avdat in the Negev Desert of Israel
 Mamshit in the Negev Desert of Israel
 Haluza in the Negev Desert of Israel
 Dahab in South Sinai, Egypt; an excavated Nabataean trading port.

See also

 List of Nabataean kings
 Azd

References

Sources

 
 
 Healey, John F., The Religion of the Nabataeans: A Conspectus (Leiden, Brill, 2001) (Religions in the Graeco-Roman World, 136).
 
 
 "Nabat", Encyclopedia of Islam, Volume VII.

External links
 Hecht Museum - Catalogues | The Nabateans in the Negev
 Hecht Museum - Exhibitions | The Nabateans in the Negev
 The Bulletin of Nabataean Studies online—links on Petra and the Nabataeans
 NABATÆANS in the Jewish Encyclopedia
 Cincinnati Art Museum—the only collection of ancient Nabataean art outside of Jordan
 Archaeological Studies—Ancient Desert Agriculture Systems Revived (ADASR)
 Petra: Lost City of Stone Exhibition—Canadian Museum of Civilization
 "Solving the Enigma of Petra and the Nabataeans", Biblical Archaeology Review
 Nabataeans a nation civilization—Petra Crown

 
Ancient Arabic peoples
Tribes of Arabia
Arab groups
Arabs in the Roman Empire
History of Saudi Arabia
History of Palestine (region)
Ancient history of Jordan
Ancient Syria
Ancient Israel and Judah
Gilead